Alfred Nicholas Cervi (February 12, 1917 – November 9, 2009) was an American professional basketball player and coach in the National Basketball League (NBL) and National Basketball Association (NBA). One of the strongest backcourt players of the 1940s and 1950s, he was always assigned to defend against the opposing team's best scoring threat. He earned the nickname "Digger" because of his hard-nosed style of defense.

Early life
Born in Buffalo, New York, Cervi attended East High School in his hometown, where he captained the baseball and basketball teams and achieved All-City honors in both sports. He dropped out of school after his junior year when he was recruited by the Buffalo Bisons of the newly formed NBL. He played in all of the Bisons' nine games in 1937–38, the franchise's only season of existence.

He never attended college. Instead, he served five years in the United States Army Air Forces from 1940 through 1945.

Rochester Royals (1945–1948)
After the conclusion of World War II, he joined the Rochester Royals, another NBL franchise entering its first year of operations. He immediately experienced success as the team captured the 1945–46 league title after sweeping the best-of-five championship series from the Sheboygan Red Skins. The Royals returned to the finals the following two seasons, but lost to the Chicago American Gears and Minneapolis Lakers in four games each. Cervi made the All-NBL First Team in 1947 and 1948. In the first of those two campaigns, he was the leading scorer with 632 points.

His time with the Royals lasted only three seasons. After discovering that other teammates were being paid more than his $7,500 annual salary, he requested a $3,500 raise, which was denied by team owner Les Harrison. As a result, instead of moving with the Royals to the Basketball Association of America (BAA) after the 1948 campaign, Cervi stayed in the NBL and joined the Syracuse Nationals, who met his salary demands and appointed him player-coach.

Syracuse Nationals (1948–1957)
Besides being named to the All-NBL First Team for a third straight year in 1949, he also earned Coach of the Year honors. After the BAA-NBL merger to form the NBA prior to the 1949–50 campaign, he continued to serve in the dual capacity role until his retirement as an active player in 1953.

The Syracuse teams he piloted took on his relentlessly competitive nature. He played a major role in the development of Dolph Schayes.

The Nationals qualified for the playoffs in eight of the nine seasons that he coached the ballclub, including three trips to the NBA Finals. They were twice defeated by the Lakers, first in six games in 1950 and then in seven in 1954. The pinnacle of Cervi's coaching career was leading his squad to the NBA Championship over the Fort Wayne Pistons in seven games in 1955.

When the Nationals began the 1956–57 campaign at 4–8, he was replaced by team captain Paul Seymour.

NBA career statistics

Regular season

Playoffs

Later years
Cervi succeeded George Senesky as coach of the Philadelphia Warriors in 1958, but left after one season to accept a more lucrative job in the trucking business as an area manager for Eastern Freightways, Inc. in Rochester, New York. In 1960 he declined to accept a two-year offer to coach the Lakers in its first campaign in Los Angeles because his wife was reluctant to leave the Rochester area. He lived in the suburb of Brighton for the last 58 years of his life.

Cervi was inducted into the Naismith Memorial Basketball Hall of Fame in 1985. He received similar honors from the Greater Buffalo Sports Hall of Fame in 2003.

He died on November 9, 2009 in Rochester, New York at the age of 92.

Cervi was featured in the book, Basketball History in Syracuse, Hoops Roots by author Mark Allen Baker published by The History Press in 2010. The book is an introduction to professional basketball in Syracuse and includes teams like (Vic Hanson's) All-Americans, the Syracuse Reds and the Syracuse Nationals  (1946–1963).

Coaching record

References

Further reading

External links
 
 

1917 births
2009 deaths
Basketball players from Buffalo, New York
United States Army Air Forces personnel of World War II
Basketball coaches from New York (state)
Buffalo Bisons (NBL) players
Naismith Memorial Basketball Hall of Fame inductees
National Basketball Association championship-winning head coaches
People from Brighton, Monroe County, New York
Philadelphia Warriors head coaches
Player-coaches
Rochester Royals players
Shooting guards
Small forwards
Sportspeople from Buffalo, New York
Syracuse Nationals head coaches
Syracuse Nationals players
United States Army Air Forces soldiers
American men's basketball players
Eastern Basketball Association coaches